Michaël Llodra was the defending champion, but chose not to compete.

Andreas Seppi won the title, defeating Janko Tipsarević in the final after Tipsarević retired with Seppi leading 7–6(7–5), 3–6, 5–3.

Seeds

Qualifying

Draw

Finals

Top half

Bottom half

References
Main Draw

Aegon International - Men's Singles
Singles